Prosoplus lividus is a species of beetle in the family Cerambycidae. It was described by Masaki Matsushita in 1935.

Prosoplus lividus was also given the second designated scientific name Prosoplus rugosicollis in 1940.

References

Prosoplus
Beetles described in 1935